Peter Reilly (c. 1933-1977) was a Canadian politician, broadcaster and journalist.

Peter Reilly may also refer to:
 Pete Reilly, Scottish guitarist of The View
 Peter Reilly murder case, US victim of miscarriage of justice in 1973.

See also
Peter Riley (disambiguation)